Räserbajs was a Swedish punk rock band formed in 1990 in Alingsås by Richard Stark and Erik Hjortstam. They released many singles but only one album, Noppriga tights och moonboots from 1995. The band also appeared on numerous compilation albums. The lyrics were sometimes childish and dirty and sometimes political. They disbanded in 1997.

Band members
Richard Stark - lead vocals, guitar (1990–1997)
Erik Hjortstam - bass, vocals (1990–1997)
Martin Gustavsson - guitar, vocals (1991–1997)
Tobias Wiik - drums, vocals (1995–1997)

Past members
Joakim Levin - drums, vocals
Joel Nadolski - drums
Daniel Levin - guitar

Discography

Album 
 Noppriga tights och moonboots (1995)

Singles 
 Drömmen om EG (1992)
 Hår på bröstet (1993)
 Fina flickor (1994)
 Jag legend (1995)

Demo 
 Klass mot klass (1990)

External links
Fan site in swedish

Swedish punk rock groups